Milwaukee Mitchell International Airport  is a civil–military airport  south of downtown Milwaukee, Wisconsin, United States. It is included in the Federal Aviation Administration (FAA) National Plan of Integrated Airport Systems for 2023–2027, in which it is categorized as a medium-hub primary commercial service facility.

The airport is named in honor of United States Army General Billy Mitchell, who was raised in Milwaukee and is often regarded as the father of the United States Air Force. Along with being the primary airport for Milwaukee, Mitchell International is also used by travelers throughout Southern and Eastern Wisconsin and Northern Illinois. Since March 1941, the airport's weather station has been used as the official point for Milwaukee weather observations and records by the National Weather Service, whose area office is located in Sullivan.

History

The original airfield was established in 1920 as Hamilton Airport by local business owner and aviator, Thomas F. Hamilton. Milwaukee County purchased the land on October 19, 1926, and renamed the airport Milwaukee County Airport. The first airport terminal there, the Hirschbuehl Farmhouse, opened in July 1927. That month, Northwest Airlines, Inc., began air service from Milwaukee to Chicago and Minneapolis/St. Paul. In August 1927, world-renowned aviator Charles Lindbergh visited the Milwaukee airport. Kohler Aviation Corporation began providing passenger service across Lake Michigan on August 31, 1929.

During the late depression years (1938–July 1940), a new two-story passenger terminal building was constructed by the Works Progress Administration. On March 17, 1941, the airport was renamed General Mitchell Field after Milwaukee native and air power advocate Brigadier General William "Billy" Mitchell. On January 4, 1945, Mitchell Field was leased to the War Department for use as a World War II prisoner-of-war camp. Over 3,000 prisoners and 250 enlisted men stayed at the work camp. Escaped German prisoners were often surprised to find a large German American population just beyond the fence.

The present terminal opened on July 20, 1955, and was designed by Leigh Fisher and Associates. It was renovated and expanded in 1985, designed by Miller, Meier, Kenyon, Cooper Architects and Planners Inc. The "hammerhead" section of the D concourse was added in 1990.

On June 19, 1986, the Milwaukee County Board of Supervisors renamed the airport General Mitchell International Airport. The airport was formerly a hub for AirTran Airways, Frontier Airlines, Midwest Airlines and North Central Airlines. The airport is owned and operated by Milwaukee County, but some Milwaukee business leaders and politicians have advocated privatization or leasing it to a third party for financial reasons.

In February 2019, the airport was renamed from "General Mitchell International Airport" to "Milwaukee Mitchell International Airport," a rebranding meant to highlight the airport's location; the old name is still used by the FAA and US government.

Expansion
Mitchell International expanded the runway safety area at the end of the runways after an accident on January 21, 2007, when Northwest Airlines Flight 1726 skidded off the runway following an aborted takeoff. Construction of the runway safety areas began at the end of summer 2009 and was completed in fall 2012.

There was also a "Master Plan" idea to increase the terminal area by stretching the existing terminal (in some cases, to almost double the size) or begin construction of a separate terminal. Nearly all cases would involve major reconstruction on the airport itself, and would have a huge impact on the airport's traffic. These plans were, however, drafted before Mitchell saw a significant reduction in carriers and flights. More recently, in 2012, there were discussions of closing one concourse as a cost-cutting move.

The approved 2018 Milwaukee County Budget contained initial funding for replacement of the now-closed Concourse E with a new International Terminal. It would replace the current International Arrivals Terminal (IAT) which has limited capacity and is not connected to the main terminal building. The new terminal was planned to open in 2020 after the demolition of Concourse E was completed. During October 2018, airport and Milwaukee County officials set a timeline for design, construction and completion of the new International terminal. Pre-design work and bidding concluded in November 2018, with construction set to begin in early 2021 and likely concluding in mid-2022. In May 2020, Milwaukee County announced with the COVID-19 pandemic severely reducing the airport's operations and de facto ending international service temporarily, that the start of the project had been postponed; a new start date is yet to be determined.

Facilities

Terminal
Milwaukee Mitchell International Airport has one terminal with two concourses and 38 gates. All international arrivals lacking border pre-clearance must pass through the International Arrivals Building.  Concourse C houses Southwest Airlines, United Airlines, and Air Canada, and Concourse D houses the remaining airlines at the airport.  There is also a Delta Sky Club in Concourse D.

The terminal houses the Mitchell Gallery of Flight (a non-profit museum) and a USO room on the concession level, along with the usual retail outlets, including a small food court and a branch of Renaissance Books which is believed to be the world's first used book store in an airport. There are play areas for children throughout the facility. An observation lot along the northern edge of the airport is open to the public and tower communications are rebroadcast using a low-power FM transmitter for visitors to tune in on their car radios. There is also a new lot on 6th Street, with a Wisconsin historical marker giving the airport's history. Inside the security perimeter is a large clay "peace mural" from Leningrad, now Saint Petersburg in Russia. Created by Soviet citizens, it was exchanged for an equivalent clay mural made by Americans. The Milwaukee mural was covered up during the 2022 Russian invasion of Ukraine.

In April 2017, all airlines housed in Concourse E began moving to Concourse C. This would allow the airport to remodel the concourse and move International Arrivals processing into the terminal. Following redevelopment of Concourse E, the current International Arrivals Building just north of the main terminals will close.

Ground transportation

Milwaukee Mitchell International Airport is accessible from I-41/I-94 and WIS 38 via WIS 119.

Local transit

 MCTS Green Line offers service to downtown and north shore suburbs. Route 80 also serves the Airport (from Oak Creek to downtown and north side).

Intercity transit

Badger Coaches has frequent trips between Mitchell Airport, Downtown Milwaukee, Johnson Creek, Goerkes Corners, and Madison.
Airport Connection serves the airport, Milwaukee Airport Rail Station (MKA), parking lots, Sheboygan and the Fox Valley Area.
Amtrak's Milwaukee Airport Rail Station is 3/4 of a mile from the airport and served by the Hiawatha Service. Free shuttle buses go between the train station and the baggage claim.
Amtrak has a Thruway Bus Service from the airport to Fond du Lac, Oshkosh, Appleton, and Green Bay. Its main purpose is to allow passengers from those cities to connect with Amtrak trains in downtown Milwaukee. However it offers service to/from Mitchell as a convenience to passengers - obviating the need for a 10-minute train ride and associated transfers. 
Wisconsin Coach Lines, as Airport Express, operates frequently to O'Hare Airport (ORD) in Chicago and from Waukesha, Milwaukee (Downtown and the Amtrak/Greyhound Station), Racine and Kenosha.
Lamers Connect, operates daily service to/from Wausau with stops in Milwaukee (Intermodal Station), Fond du Lac, Oshkosh, Appleton, Waupaca and Stevens Point.

Military
The airport also hosts the General Mitchell Air National Guard Base on the eastern area of the airport property, home to the 128th Air Refueling Wing (128 ARW), an Air Mobility Command (AMC)-gained unit of the Wisconsin Air National Guard flying the KC-135R Stratotanker. The wing performs both Federal and State missions and consists of approximately 1000 Air National Guard personnel, both full-time Active Guard and Reserve (AGR) and Air Reserve Technicians (ART), as well as traditional part-time guardsmen, available for worldwide deployment in support of Air Mobility Command and combatant commander tasking. The wing also maintains a KC-135 flight simulator, providing training proficiency for its own crews, as well as other KC-135 flight crews in other air refueling wings and air mobility wings in the Regular U.S. Air Force, the Air Force Reserve Command and the Air National Guard.

Prior to 2007, a second military installation on the southwestern portion of the airport property was known as "General Mitchell Air Reserve Station" and was home to the 440th Airlift Wing (440 AW), an Air Mobility Command (AMC)-gained unit of the Air Force Reserve Command (AFRC) flying the C-130H Hercules. While based at General Mitchell ARS, the 440 AW numbered in excess of 1500 full-time AGR, ART and part-time traditional reservists. Pursuant to 2005 Base Realignment and Closure Commission (BRAC) action, the 440 AW relocated to Pope AFB, North Carolina, in 2007 and the former AFRC facilities were turned over to the Air National Guard, resulting in the installation's renaming.

Airlines and destinations

Passenger

Cargo

Statistics

Passenger numbers

Airline market share

Top destinations

Accidents and incidents
 On December 17, 1954, a Miller Brewing Company plane, a converted twin-engine Lockheed Ventura bound for Winnipeg on a Friday evening, had trouble with both engines and crashed shortly after takeoff from Mitchell Field. All four on board were killed, which included company president Fred Miller and his oldest son, 20-year-old Fred Jr., and the two company pilots, brothers Joseph and Paul Laird.
The Cessna was destroyed, but its cabin remained embedded in the Convair's forward baggage compartment; the Cessna's three occupants were killed. The Convair made a safe emergency landing at Milwaukee. The Cessna was on a VFR flight from Lombard, Illinois to Sheboygan County Memorial Airport in Sheboygan Falls. It was determined that the inability of the Convair 580 flight crew to detect the Cessna 150 visually in sufficient time to take evasive action, despite having been provided with three radar traffic advisories, caused the crash. Visual detection capabilities were reduced by the heavy accumulation of insect smears on the windows of the Convair. Visibility was further reduced by haze, smoke and sunglare, and by the inconspicuous colour and lack of relative motion of the Cessna.
The weather was foggy with a visibility of a half mile. Four of the 11 people on board were killed and the plane was damaged beyond repair.
 On January 22, 1971, Northwest Airlines Flight 433 was hijacked after taking off from Milwaukee to Detroit, Michigan. The hijacker demanded to be taken to Algeria, but landed in Cuba.
 On September 6, 1985, Midwest Express Flight 105, Midwest's first and only fatal accident, crashed upon takeoff from Milwaukee. One of the airline's Douglas DC-9s crashed while taking off, bound for Atlanta's Hartsfield International Airport. According to NTSB reports, the crash was caused by improper pilot reaction when the plane's right engine failed due to stress corrosion cracking. The improper flight control inputs caused an uncommanded roll and accelerated stall. The 31 people on board died.
 On December 10, 1993, a Wisconsin Air National Guard KC-135 blew up on the ground. Six maintenance personnel died.
 In early August 1997, an SR-71 declared an in-air emergency prior to a fly-by at the Oshkosh Airshow and diverted to General Mitchell International Airport. No one was hurt in the incident.
 On August 31, 2005, a Midwest Airlines Boeing 717 bumped a weed spraying truck and damaged the plane's left wing. No one was hurt in the incident.
The accident was due to an explosion in one of the engines, forcing the pilot to abort takeoff. The aircraft was headed for Detroit Metropolitan Wayne County Airport and was to continue on to Buffalo Niagara International Airport. Amongst the 104 people aboard, only one back injury was reported.
 On January 23, 2007, two Freight Runners Express cargo planes collided and burned on a taxiway. Both pilots were able to escape without injury. The planes were a Cessna 402 and a Beech 99. An NTSB investigation determined both pilots and air traffic control were at fault for the accident.
 On June 4, 2007, a Cessna Citation II crashed after reporting a runaway trim tab. The pilot issued a distress signal within five minutes after taking off. The plane then crashed into Lake Michigan two miles (3 km) off shore. The plane was carrying an organ transplant team from the University of Michigan back to Willow Run Airport. There was a crew of two and four passengers aboard. All six died.
On September 12, 2008, at 7:13 PM, a Cirrus SR22 heading from Milwaukee bound for Lakeland Airport in Vilas County crashed half of a mile southwest of the airport. All three people on board died.

See also

 Milwaukee County Transit System
 Milwaukee Intermodal Station
 Milwaukee Airport station
 Hiawatha Service
 Empire Builder
 List of intercity bus stops in Wisconsin

References

Further reading
 Tascher, Joe. "Can't find a nonstop flight from Mitchell International? Check again." Milwaukee Journal-Sentinel. July 16, 2013.

External links

 Official website
 Milwaukee County Fire Department
 Milwaukee Airport Railroad Station
 

Airports in Wisconsin
Buildings and structures in Milwaukee
Transportation in Milwaukee